General elections were held in the Gambia on 28 and 29 March 1972. They were won by the ruling party, the People's Progressive Party, which took 28 of the 32 elected seats (including five in which its candidates were unopposed).

Results

References

Parliamentary elections in the Gambia
1972 in the Gambia
Gambia
March 1972 events in Africa
Election and referendum articles with incomplete results